Ejanding is a townsite in the central Wheatbelt region of Western Australia. It was originally a siding on the Ejanding Northward railway, a line built between the town now known as Amery, and Kalannie, around 1927. Amery was originally named Ejanding in 1910, but was changed to Amery in 1928. Ejanding was gazetted as a townsite in 1930. Its name is Aboriginal in origin, derived from "Hejanding Well", a name first recorded by the surveyor/explorer Augustus Gregory in 1846.

Ejanding used to have a primary school. It operated from 1926 until 2000, closing due to low numbers.
Currently Ejanding has a few houses, a wheatbin and railway siding, and is the location of the Dowerin Go Kart Club.

The surrounding areas produce wheat and other cereal crops. The town is a receival site for Cooperative Bulk Handling.

References

Towns in Western Australia
Grain receival points of Western Australia
Shire of Dowerin